Pavin Chachavalpongpun (born 4 March 1971) is a Thai scholar, associate professor and political exile. He was born in Bangkok, Thailand. He graduated with a bachelor's degree from the Faculty of Political Science (International Relations), Chulalongkorn University, and a doctorate in Political Studies from SOAS University of London. He worked as a diplomat in Thailand's Ministry of Foreign Affairs for thirteen years, then as a political science academic, and he is currently a professor at Kyoto University, where he is editor-in-chief of its Center for Southeast Asian Studies' Kyoto Review of Southeast Asia. He is the author of several books including "A Plastic Nation: The Curse of Thainess in Thai-Burmese Relations" (2005), "Reinventing Thailand: Thaksin and His Foreign Policy" (2010), and "Coup, King, Crisis: A Critical Interregnum in Thailand" (2020).

He is a well known critic of the state of Thai monarchy and Thai politics, regularly gives lecture and writes articles, books and opinion editorials on the topics, for outlets like The Washington Post, The New York Times and the South China Morning Post. He supported reforms of the monarchy and the country's lèse majesté law. In 2011, he launched a campaign to free a political prisoner, Ah Kong, who was charged with lèse majesté for allegedly sending text messages which insulted the monarchy to an unknown person. After the 2014 Thai coup d'état, the junta ordered him to turn himself in, but he refused and even mocked the summons by asking if he could send his pet chihuahua to meet with junta leader General Prayut Chan-o-cha in his stead. On 13 June 2014, the NCPO issued an arrest warrant against Pavin, and he has lived in exile ever since. His current residence is in Kyoto, Japan. In July, 2019, he was apparently assaulted near his residence, in an incident allegedly linked to the Thai authorities.

In 2020, he launched a Facebook page "The Royalists Marketplace" as a forum to discuss and criticize the Thai monarchy freely. The Thai authorities successfully took action to shut down access to the Facebook page, which has accumulated around one million users, and which Facebook may be appealing, while Pavin is facing a charge of cybercrime. He has since launched a replacement Facebook page "The Royalists Marketplace-Talad Luang". A Facebook spokesperson stated, “Requests like this are severe, contravene international human rights law, and have a chilling effect on people’s ability to express themselves... We work to protect and defend the rights of all internet users and are preparing to legally challenge this request.”

See also 

 2020 Thai protests
 Censorship of Facebook

References

External links 
 
 
 

1971 births
Alumni of SOAS University of London
Pavin Chachavalpongpun
Pavin Chachavalpongpun
Academic staff of Kyoto University
Pavin Chachavalpongpun
Living people
Pavin Chachavalpongpun
Refugees in Japan
Pavin Chachavalpongpun
Pavin Chachavalpongpun
Pavin Chachavalpongpun
Pavin Chachavalpongpun
Pavin Chachavalpongpun